The second government of Pedro Sánchez was formed on 13 January 2020, following the latter's election as Prime Minister of Spain by the Congress of Deputies on 7 January and his swearing-in on 8 January, as a result of the Spanish Socialist Workers' Party (PSOE) emerging as the largest parliamentary force at the November 2019 general election.

The cabinet comprises members of the PSOE (including its sister party, the Socialists' Party of Catalonia, PSC) and Unidas Podemos—with the involvement of Podemos, United Left (IU), the Communist Party of Spain (PCE) and En Comú Podem (ECP)—as well as independents proposed by both parties, to become the first nationwide coalition government to be formed in Spain since the Second Spanish Republic. It has been alternatively dubbed as the "progressive coalition", after the name of the political agreement signed by PSOE and Unidas Podemos.

At 22 ministries, it is the second largest cabinet in Spain since the country's transition to democracy, only behind the third Súarez government; the first time that a government includes four deputy prime ministers; and the third oldest government to be formed, with a median age of 54.2 upon its formation. After the July 2021 cabinet reshuffle, the median age of the government lowered to 50, and the proportion of women at ministerial posts increased to 63.6% (14 out of 22).

Investiture

Cabinet changes
Sánchez's second government saw a number of cabinet changes during its tenure:

On 30 December 2020, it was announced that Salvador Illa would be stepping down as Minister of Health in order to run as the Socialists' Party of Catalonia (PSC)'s leading candidate for President of the Government of Catalonia in the upcoming 2021 Catalan regional election. Minister of Territorial Policy and Civil Service Carolina Darias was proposed to replace him in his post due to her knowledge and cooperation in Illa's ministry's management of the COVID-19 pandemic, whereas outgoing PSC candidate Miquel Iceta was commented as a likely pick for Darias's former ministry.
After the surprise announcement on 10 March 2021 by Madrilenian president Isabel Díaz Ayuso to expel Citizens (Cs) from her government and call a snap election in the Community of Madrid for 4 May, as a result of a foiled attempt from both PSOE and Cs to bring down the Murcian government of Fernando López Miras, the second deputy prime minister Pablo Iglesias announced that he would be stepping down in shortly from his cabinet posts in order to run as the Unidas Podemos leading candidate in the regional election. Iglesias pointed to Labour and Social Economy minister Yolanda Díaz as his successor in the Unidas Podemos leadership, whereas State Secretary for the 2030 Agenda, Ione Belarra, would replace him at the helm of the Ministry of Social Rights and 2030 Agenda. Díaz would be appointed as new third deputy prime minister as a way to compensate for her strong labour portfolio, whereas Nadia Calviño was to ascend as new second deputy.
On 10 July 2021, Pedro Sánchez unveiled one of the largest cabinet reshuffles in Spanish democracy: seven ministers—Carmen Calvo (First Deputy and Presidency), Arancha González Laya (Foreign Affairs), Juan Carlos Campo (Justice), José Luis Ábalos (Transport), Isabel Celaá (Education), José Manuel Rodríguez Uribes (Culture) and Pedro Duque (Science)—were replaced by new officeholders, with further two ministries (Finance and Territorial Policy) seeing changes in their structures, with civil service competences being transferred from the latter to the former, as well as the office of the spokesperson of the Government. After Calvo's dismissal from the cabinet, the third remaining deputy prime ministers (Nadia Calviño, Yolanda Díaz and Teresa Ribera) were promoted, with the post of the fourth deputy prime minister being disestablished. The changes were effective from 12 July, with the new ministers taking their posts on that day.

Council of Ministers
The Council of Ministers is structured into the offices for the prime minister, the four deputy prime ministers, 22 ministries and the post of the spokesperson of the Government. From July 2021, the Council would include only three deputy prime ministers.

Departmental structure
Pedro Sánchez's second government is organised into several superior and governing units, whose number, powers and hierarchical structure may vary depending on the ministerial department.

Unit/body rank
() Secretary of state
() Undersecretary
() Director-general
() Autonomous agency
() Military & intelligence agency

Notes

References

External links
Governments of Spain 2011–present. Ministers of Mariano Rajoy and Pedro Sánchez. Historia Electoral.com (in Spanish).

2020 establishments in Spain
Cabinets established in 2020
Coalition governments
Council of Ministers (Spain)
Current governments